Phyllia is a monotypic moth genus in the family Geometridae. It is considered by Luis E. Parra and Carla A. Alvear to be a synonym of Ennada. As a genus, its only species is Phyllia triangularia, which is found in Chile. Both the genus and species were described by Blanchard in 1852.

References

Larentiinae
Endemic fauna of Chile